The women's 200m Sprint at the 1996 Summer Olympics Cycling was an event that consisted of cyclists making three laps around the track.  Only the time for the last 200 meters of the 750 meters covered was counted as official time. The races were held on Wednesday, July 24, Thursday, July 25, Friday, July 26, and Saturday, July 27, 1996 at the Stone Mountain Velodrome.

Medalists

Results
 Q denotes qualification by place in heat.
 q denotes qualification by overall place.
 REL denotes relegated- due to being passed
 DNS denotes did not start.
 DNF denotes did not finish.
 DQ denotes disqualification.
 NR denotes national record.
 OR denotes Olympic record.
 WR denotes world record.
 PB denotes personal best.
 SB denotes season best.

Qualifying round
Held July 24

Times and average speeds are listed. 12 qualifying riders were seeded by these results for the first round.

1/8 final

Held July 25.
The 1/8 round consisted of six matches, each pitting two of the twelve cyclists against each other.  The winners 
advanced to the quarterfinals, with the losers getting another chance in the 1/8 repechage.

1/8 repechage

Held July 25. 
The six cyclists defeated in the 1/8 round competed in the 1/8 repechage.  Two heats of three riders were held.  Winners rejoined the victors from the 1/8 round and advanced to the quarterfinals.

Quarterfinals
Held July 26. 
The eight riders that had advanced to the quarterfinals competed pairwise in four matches.  Each match consisted of two races, with a potential third race being used as a tie-breaker if each cyclist won one of the first two races.  All four quarterfinals matches were decided without a third race.  Winners advanced to the semifinals, losers competed in a 5th to 8th place classification.

Classification 5-8
Held July 26 
The 5-8 classification was a single race with all four riders that had lost in the quarterfinals taking place.  The winner of the race received 5th place, with the others taking the three following places in order.

Semifinals

Held July 26 
The four riders that had advanced to the semifinals competed pairwise in two matches.  Each match consisted of two races, with a potential third race being used as a tie-breaker if each cyclist won one of the first two races. Winners advanced to the finals, losers competed in the bronze medal match.

Medal Finals
Held July 27.

Bronze medal match
The bronze medal match was contested in a set of three races, with the winner of two races declared the winner.

Gold medal match
The gold medal match was contested in a set of three races, with the winner of two races declared the winner.

Final classification

References

External links
Official Olympic Report

Cycling at the 1996 Summer Olympics
Cycling at the Summer Olympics – Women's sprint
Track cycling at the 1996 Summer Olympics
Olymp
Cyc